Epilepsy surgery involves a neurosurgical procedure where an area of the brain involved in seizures is either resected, ablated, disconnected or stimulated.  The goal is to eliminate seizures or significantly reduce seizure burden. Approximately 60% of all people with epilepsy (0.4% of the population of industrialized countries) have focal epilepsy syndromes. In 15% to 20% of these patients, the condition is not adequately controlled with anticonvulsive drugs. Such patients are potential candidates for surgical epilepsy treatment.

First line therapy for epilepsy involves treatment with anticonvulsive drugs, also called antiepileptic drugs.  Most patients will respond to one or two different medication trials.  The goal of this treatment is the elimination of seizures, since uncontrolled seizures carry significant risks, including injury and sudden death.  However, in up to one third of patients, medications alone do not eliminate seizures, and/or cause adverse effects.  In these patients, epilepsy surgery is considered as an alternate treatment method to medications.

Generally, surgery is considered in patients whose seizures cannot be controlled by adequate trials of two different medications.  Epilepsy surgery has been performed for more than a century, but its use dramatically increased in the 1980s and 1990s, reflecting its efficacy in selected patients.

Evaluation
The evaluation for epilepsy surgery is designed to locate the "epileptic focus" (the location of the epileptic abnormality) and to determine if resective surgery will affect normal brain function. The definition of the epileptogenic zone has a fundamental role in determining the boundaries of the area that needs to be removed in order to achieve seizure freedom but also in order not to harm “eloquent cortex” (damage to this area produces neurological deficit). As the localization technology has improved, the definition of the epileptogenic zone has expanded to comprise a larger area of the brain than before. Resective surgery involves the resection, or cutting away, of brain tissue from the area of the brain that consists of the epileptic focus. Physicians will also confirm the diagnosis of epilepsy to make sure that spells arise from epilepsy (as opposed to non-epileptic seizures). The evaluation typically includes neurological examination, routine EEG, Long-term video-EEG monitoring, neuropsychological evaluation, and neuroimaging such as MRI, single photon emission computed tomography (SPECT), positron emission tomography (PET). Some epilepsy centers use intracarotid sodium amobarbital test (Wada test), functional MRI (fMRI) or magnetoencephalography  (MEG) as supplementary tests. Recently it has been suggested that computer models of seizure generation may provide valuable additional information regarding the source of seizures.

If noninvasive testing was inadequate in identifying the epileptic focus or in distinguishing the surgical target from normal brain tissue and function, then Long-term video-EEG monitoring with the use of intracranial electrodes may be required for evaluation. Brain mapping by the technique of cortical electrical stimulation or Electrocorticography are other procedures used in the process of invasive testing for certain patients.

Once the epilepsy focus is located, the specific surgery involved in treatment is decided on. The type of surgery depends on the location of the seizure focal point. Surgeries for epilepsy treatment include, but are not limited to, the following types: temporal lobe resection, hemispherectomy, ground temporal and extratemporal resection, parietal resection, occipital resection, frontal resection, extratemporal resection, and callosotomy.

Hemispherectomy
Hemispherectomy or hemispherotomy involves removal or a functional disconnection of most, or all of, one half of the brain typically leaving the basal ganglia and thalamus. It is reserved for people with the most catastrophic epilepsies, such as those due to Rasmussen's encephalitis. If the surgery is performed on very young patients (2–5 years old), then the remaining hemisphere may acquire some motor control of the ipsilateral body due to neuroplasticity; in older patients, paralysis results on the side of the body opposite to the part of the brain that was removed with less prospect for recovery. A visual field defect is an unavoidable side effect, typically involving a homonymous hemianopia involving loss of the half of the visual field on the same side of the disconnected brain. Because of these and other side-effects, it is usually reserved for patients having exhausted other treatment options.

Temporal lobe resection
Temporal lobe resection acts as a treatment option for patients with temporal lobe epilepsy, or those whose seizure focus is in the temporal lobe. Temporal lobe seizures are the most common type of seizures for teens and young adults. The procedure involves resecting, or cutting away, brain tissue within the region of the temporal lobe in order to remove the seizure focus. Specific evaluation for temporal lobe resection requires convergent clinical, MRI, and EEG data in order to precisely pinpoint the focal area and boundaries of the focal area.

The surgery has produced successful outcomes, controlling seizures in 65 percent of temporal lobe epilepsy patients. Follow-up studies suggest that the procedure also has produced positive long-term effects that illustrate 63 percent of patients still remaining seizure-free.  Although the procedure produces positive outcomes for patients regarding seizure control, the surgery can also produce negative outcomes such as memory impairment. Impairment depends on the hemisphere of resection; temporal lobe resection of the dominant hemisphere often causes verbal memory impairment while temporal lobe resection of the non-dominant hemisphere often causes visual memory impairment.

Extratemporal lobe resection
Extratemporal lobe resection acts as a treatment option for patients with extratemporal epilepsy, or epilepsy patients whose seizure focus is outside of the temporal lobe, and stems from either the occipital lobes, parietal lobe, frontal lobe, or in multiple lobes. The evaluation for the procedure often requires more than clinical, MRI, and EEG convergence due to the variability of the seizure focus. Along with additional imaging techniques such as PET and SPECT, invasive studies may be needed to pinpoint the seizure focus. The efficacy of extratemporal lobe resection generally is less than resection of the temporal lobe. For example, in frontal lobe resections seizure freedom has been achieved in 38-44 percent of patients.

Laser Ablation

See ablative brain surgery.

See also
 Engel classification
 The Terminal Man (film)

References

Neurosurgical procedures